The 1961 Windward Islands Tournament was an international football tournament hosted in Saint Lucia in 1961.

Final table

References

External links
competition profile at rsssf.com

Football competitions in Saint Lucia
Windward Islands Tournament